This is a list of compositions for flute (particularly the Western concert flute).

Solo flute 

 C. P. E. Bach:
Sonata in A minor (1763)
 J.S. Bach:
Partita in A minor for solo flute ( 1718)
 Luciano Berio:
 Sequenza I (1958)
 Claude Debussy:
 Syrinx (1913)
 Arthur Honegger:
 Danse de la chèvre (1921)
 Robert Muczynski:
 Three Preludes, Op. 18 (1962)
 Karlheinz Stockhausen:
Amour (1981)
Harmonien (2006)
 Tōru Takemitsu
 Voice (1971)
 Georg Philipp Telemann: 
12 Fantasias for Solo Flute (1733)
 Edgard Varèse: 
Density 21.5 (1936)

Solo flute with piano 
This section does not include flute sonatas which are listed at their respective page.

 Aaron Copland:
 Duo for Flute and Piano (1971)
 Gabriel Fauré:
 Fantaisie, Op. 79
André Jolivet:
 Chant de Linos for flute and piano (1944)
 Olivier Messiaen:
 Le merle noir (1952)
 Camille Saint-Saëns:
 Romance, Op. 37 (1871)

Flute and other instruments 

 Ludwig van Beethoven:
Serenade for flute, violin and viola in D major, Op. 25
Trio for piano, flute, and bassoon in G major, WoO 37
 Pierre Boulez: 
…explosante-fixe…, various configurations with flute and other instruments (1971–72, 1973–74, 1985, 1991–93)
Le marteau sans maître for contralto voice, alto flute, viola, guitar, xylorimba, vibraphone, and percussion
 Carlos Chávez:
Soli II for flute, oboe, clarinet, bassoon, and horn
Xochipilli, for piccolo, flute, E-flat clarinet, trombone, and six percussionists
 Claude Debussy:
Sonata for flute, viola and harp
 André Jolivet:
 Pastorales de Noël, for flute, bassoon, and harp
 Camille Saint-Saëns:
 Caprice sur des airs danois et russes, for flute, oboe, clarinet and piano
 Karlheinz Stockhausen:
 Adieu, for flute, oboe, clarinet, bassoon, and horn
 Zeitmaße, for flute, oboe, cor anglais, clarinet, and bassoon
 Georg Philipp Telemann:
 Paris quartets (12) for flute, violin, viola da gamba or cello, and continuo (1730 and 1738)
 Edgard Varèse:
 Octandre for piccolo (doubling piccolo), oboe, clarinet, horn, bassoon, trumpet, trombone, and double bass
 Heitor Villa-Lobos:
 Bachianas Brasileiras No. 6 for flute and bassoon
 Chôros No. 2 for flute and clarinet
 Chôros No. 7 for flute, oboe, clarinet, alto saxophone, bassoon, violin, and cello with tam-tam ad lib
 Quinteto (em forma de chôros) for flute, oboe, cor anglais, clarinet, and bassoon
 Carl Maria von Weber:
Trio for Piano, Flute and Cello in G minor, Op. 63, J. 259 (1818-19)

Flute and orchestra 
This section does not include flute concertos which are listed at their respective page.
 Wolfgang Amadeus Mozart:
 Andante in C major for Flute and Orchestra, K. 315 (1778)

See also 
 Flute ensemble

References

Bibliography

Further reading

External links 
 Selected Flute Repertoire & Studies by the National Flute Association